Richard L. Lewis (born June 8, 1950) is a former American football linebacker in the National Football League who played for the Houston Oilers, Buffalo Bills, and New York Jets. He played college football for the Portland State Vikings. He also played in the Canadian Football League for the Toronto Argonauts in the 1976-79 seasons and the Hamilton Tiger-Cats in 1977.

References

1950 births
Living people
American football linebackers
Canadian football linebackers
Houston Oilers players
Buffalo Bills players
New York Jets players
Toronto Argonauts players
Hamilton Tiger-Cats players
Portland State Vikings football players